WPHT (1210 AM) is a commercial radio station licensed to Philadelphia, Pennsylvania. The station broadcasts a talk radio format and is owned by Audacy, Inc.  Its transmitter and broadcast tower are in Moorestown, New Jersey.  The radio studios are in Audacy's corporate headquarters in Center City Philadelphia.

WPHT is a Class A, 50,000-watt, clear channel station.  Its signal covers much of the Lehigh Valley region of eastern Pennsylvania and parts of New Jersey, Delaware, and Maryland.  At night, with a good radio, it can be heard in much of the U.S. East Coast and Eastern Canada.  Programming is also available to listeners with an HD Radio receiver via the HD3 digital subchannel of sister station 98.1 WOGL.

Programming

Talk
WPHT programming is mostly conservative talk.  On weekday mornings and middays, local hosts discuss a mix of national issues and news in the Delaware Valley.  On weekday afternoons and nights, nationally syndicated shows are heard, including Sean Hannity, Mark Levin, Dana Loesch and "Coast to Coast AM with George Noory."  On weekends, shows focus on money, health, law and real estate, some of which are paid brokered programming.  Mike Opelka hosts a show Saturday evenings.  Sunday middays feature the long-running "Sounds of Sinatra with Sid Mark."  Some hours begin with national news from CBS Radio News.  Weather is supplied by Channel 6 WPVI-TV.

Sports
WPHT airs Temple University football and men's basketball.  It was the flagship station for Philadelphia Phillies baseball for 32 years, until the 2016 season, when co-owned 94.1 WIP-FM took over that role. However, WPHT will still carry any Phillies games that WIP-FM is unable to air due to programming conflicts.

History

Early years
The station first began broadcasting as WCAU in May 1922.  It was a 250-watt station operating out of electrician William Durham's home at 19th and Market Streets. It is Philadelphia's third-oldest radio station, having signed on two months after WIP (now WTEL) and WFIL. In 1924, WCAU was sold to law partners Ike Levy and Daniel Murphy. Murphy later bowed out in favor of Ike's brother, Leon, a local dentist.

The station began its long association with CBS in 1927, when it was one of 16 charter network affiliates of the Columbia Phonographic Broadcasting System, a network airing CBS' first program on September 18, 1927. The network struggled to find advertisers, however, and William S. Paley, who had previously purchased time on the station for an entertainment program promoting his family's La Palina cigars, bought the network with $500,000 of his family's money and renamed it the Columbia Broadcasting System.

Actor Paul Douglas began his career at WCAU, where he worked as an announcer and sportscaster from 1928 to 1934.

Power boost and shortwave
In 1930, WCAU initiated a shortwave radio service, operating under the call sign W3XAU. It is believed that this was the first license issued by the FCC for a commercial international shortwave broadcast station. Initially W3XAU simulcast WCAU programming, but eventually original programming was created specifically for international listeners. W3XAU, later WCAI, then WCAB, was closed down in 1941 as CBS consolidated various shortwave operations. The 10 kW shortwave transmitter was disassembled, and WCAU staff were told that it was sent to England to aid the BBC war propaganda efforts. However, the transmitter was actually sent to Camp X, a secret World War II paramilitary and commando training facility located near Toronto, Ontario, Canada, becoming part of the Hydra signals intelligence and communications program.  

A series of power increases brought the station to 50,000 watts, with a new 50,000-watt transmitter dedicated October 2, 1932. The Levy brothers eventually became major stockholders in CBS, and were members of the network's board for many years.

Studios and FM
On December 26, 1932, WCAU moved to a new facility at 1622 Chestnut Street. Broadcasting (magazine) called it "a thoroughly modern 9-story building ... erected especially for the WCAU Broadcasting Co." The building included eight studios and "a special office for Leopold Stokowski, director of the Philadelphia Orchestra."

WCAU began experimenting with an FM station in 1942 and it was licensed in 1943.  The call sign in its early years was WCAU-FM and it broadcast at 102.9 MHz.

CBS ownership
The Levys agreed to sell WCAU-AM-FM to The Philadelphia Record in 1946. However, the Record folded shortly thereafter, and its "goodwill," including the rights to buy WCAU-AM-FM, passed to the Philadelphia Bulletin, which already owned WPEN and WPEN-FM, and had secured a construction permit for WPEN-TV (channel 10). In a complex deal, the Bulletin sold off WPEN and WCAU-FM, while changing WPEN-FM's call sign to WCAU-FM and WPEN-TV's call letters to WCAU-TV. The Levys continued to run the stations while serving as consultants to the Bulletin, and it was largely due to their influence that WCAU-TV took to the air on May 23, 1948, as a CBS affiliate. The stations moved to a new studio in Bala Cynwyd in 1952.

In 1957, the Bulletin sold WCAU-AM-FM-TV to CBS. This came because the Bulletin had recently bought WGBI-TV in Scranton, Pennsylvania and changed its call sign to WDAU-TV to complement WCAU. However, the two television stations' signals overlapped so much that it constituted a duopoly under Federal Communications Commission (FCC) rules of the time. CBS had to get a waiver to keep its new Philadelphia cluster. In addition to significant overlap of the television stations' grade B signals, the FCC normally did not allow common ownership of clear channel stations with overlapping nighttime signals.

Talk and news
In the 1960s, WCAU gradually began moving away from music programming, as most CBS stations.  By 1967 it had become a talk station with considerable strengths in news and sports.  All of Philadelphia's major professional sports teams had WCAU as their flagship radio station at one time or another. Although the station's ratings were good, in the mid-1970s, CBS made a corporate decision to move WCAU to an all-news format.  All-news had earlier been established on WCBS in New York City, KNX Los Angeles and several other CBS AM stations. 

WCAU never caught up to established all-news rival KYW 1060 AM.  By 1980, WCAU was making moves to reclaim its heritage as a talk and sports leader. However, 96.5 WWDB-FM had established itself as a strong talk station, and WCAU struggled for years to attract listeners and establish a consistent image.

Oldies and sports
On August 15, 1990, CBS abruptly changed the WCAU call sign after 68 years, becoming WOGL.  It dropped the talk format in favor of oldies of the 1950s, 60s and 70s.  It was partially simulcast with its FM sister station, by then WOGL-FM. 

In 1993, the AM station began running sports talk after 7 p.m.. The station went all-sports as WGMP (The Game) on March 18, 1994. However, once again, the station was taking on an entrenched competitor, WIP 610 AM, and WGMP's largely syndicated program lineup won few listeners away from WIP's heavily local schedule.

Merger with Westinghouse
A year later, CBS merged with Westinghouse Electric Corporation, thus making 1210 AM a sister station to its long-time rival, 1060 KYW. With this move, the higher-rated KYW became the flagship station of CBS Radio's Philadelphia cluster. Realizing that WGMP would never be able to compete against WIP, CBS began phasing out the sports talk shows in the summer of 1996. 

Finally, on August 23, 1210 AM went all-talk once again as WPTS (We're Philadelphia's Talk Station). The call sign was changed again less than a month later to the current WPHT to avoid confusion with nearby Trenton, New Jersey's WPST. Ironically, only a year later, WIP became a sister station to WPHT when CBS merged with its owner, Infinity Broadcasting Corporation (at the time part of Viacom).

Entercom ownership
On February 2, 2017, CBS Radio announced it would merge with Entercom. The merger was approved on November 9, 2017, and was consummated on the 17th.

In 2020, WPHT host Ken Matthews was named one of the 100 most important talk radio show hosts (the "Heavy Hundred") in America by TALKERS Magazine.

See also
Broadcasting of sports events
CBS radio
KYW (AM)
WIP-FM
WOGL

Notes

References

External links
FCC History Cards for WPHT
 

Moorestown, New Jersey
PHT
News and talk radio stations in the United States
Radio stations established in 1922
1922 establishments in Pennsylvania
Audacy, Inc. radio stations
Clear-channel radio stations
Radio stations licensed before 1923 and still broadcasting